is a Japanese voice actress and singer. She played Noel Vermillion in BlazBlue.

Personal life
In November 2020, it was announced that she had recently gotten married and is currently pregnant.

In 6:02pm April 24 2021, she had announced that she gave birth to her first child, a boy in her twitter.

Filmography

Anime

Video games

Drama CDs

Dubbing

Discography

Albums

References

External links
Official agency profile 
 on Target Entertainment 

1981 births
Living people
Japanese women pop singers
Japanese video game actresses
Japanese voice actresses
Singers from Tokyo
Voice actresses from Tokyo
21st-century Japanese actresses
21st-century Japanese singers
21st-century Japanese women singers